Mardol may refer to:
 Mardol (street), in Shrewsbury, Shropshire, England
 Mardol, Goa, India